The 1954–55 season was the 71st Scottish football season in which Dumbarton competed at national level, entering the Scottish Football League, the Scottish Cup and the Supplementary League Cup.  In addition Dumbarton competed in the Stirlingshire Cup.

Scottish League Division C (South-West)

With club finances re-structured, a new manager (Peter McGown having taken over from Willie Irvine) and a new youthful team in place, the season was approached with some confidence, in the knowledge that only winning the league would guarantee a return to the top 'tiers' of Scottish football.

However, things were not going to be easy, since apart from Stranraer, their league opponents would be the reserve (or 'A') sides of the bigger clubs from the top two divisions - and so it was to prove, for despite challenging strongly throughout the season, and topping the league in early March, in the end only 4th place out of 13 was achieved,

Nevertheless, league re-construction at the end of the season meant that the Divisions C were brought to an end, with Dumbarton, Stranraer, Montrose, East Stirling and Berwick Rangers all joining a revamped 19 team Second Division for season 1955-56.

League table
Top Four

Scottish Cup

There was an early exit in the Cup with Dumbarton losing to Montrose in the third round.

Scottish Supplementary League Cup
No progress was made from the sectional games in the Supplementary League Cup, finishing 5th of 7.

Section Table

Stirlingshire Cup
There was also a first round defeat in the county cup, to East Stirling.

Friendlies

Player statistics

|}

Source:

Transfers
Amongst those players joining and leaving the club were the following:

Players in

Players out 

Source:

Reserve Team
Dumbarton only played one official 'reserve' match in the Second XI Cup, losing in the first round to Clyde, after a replay.

References

Dumbarton F.C. seasons
Scottish football clubs 1954–55 season